The Council of Castile, known earlier as the Royal Council, was a ruling body and key part of the domestic government of the Crown of Castile, second only to the monarch himself.  It was established under Queen Isabella I in 1480 as the chief body dealing with administrative and judicial matters of the realm.  With the 1516 ascension of King Charles I (later Holy Roman Emperor Charles V) to the throne of both Castile and Aragon, the Royal Council came to be known as the Council of Castile because Charles was king of many dominions other than Castile, while the Council retained responsibility only over Castile.

During periods in which there was no monarch, an absent monarch, or an incompetent monarch, the Royal Council would rule as a regency council in his place.  The Council weakened in the 19th century, where it was abolished and re-established several times before being dissolved permanently.

History

Origins 

The earliest form of the Royal Council was created at the end of the fourteenth century in 1385 by King John after the disaster at the Battle of Aljubarrota.  It consisted of 12 members, four from each of the clergy, the cities, and the nobility.  In 1442 the nobility increased its influence on the council, adding many nobles as titular members of the council.  Sixty became the new number of members.

Under the Catholic Monarchs: Centralization 
This council was rather ineffective and the Catholic Monarchs, King Ferdinand II of Aragon and Isabella I, sought to change it in their drive to centralize the country and bring it more firmly in line with national interests rather than the nobles.  In 1480, they passed the Act of Resumption at the Cortes of Toledo.  This act would allow Ferdinand and Isabella to directly appoint bureaucrats, rather than letting the independent and erratic nobles rule.  The Royal Council would control both a royal army and manage tax disputes, which would place nobles more securely under the control of the Crown.

The new composition of the reformed Council was a president, a treasurer, a church prelate, three caballeros (often minor nobility), and between eight and ten letrados (lawyers or jurists).  These were Council's chief duties:

To advise the Crown on matters of appointments, both military and civil
Until the creation of the Council of the Indies, to supervise works, projects, expeditions, and colonizations commissioned by the Castilian government, in the Old World and New World (Requerimiento)
To offer consideration of and judgment to the Crown regarding the conferring of pensions, emoluments, and sundry favors
To serve as the supreme court of justice of the Kingdom of Castile
To have all members of the Council sign all legal documents that in any way effected the working of the Crown, including detailed, day-to-day governmental decisions

In order to prevent it from falling under control of the great noble houses, as had happened with the original royal council, non-appointed nobles were allowed to attend Council meetings but were given no vote. The result of this meant that the council, and its bureaucracy, was composed chiefly of "new men": the minor nobility, townsmen, and civilian magistrates.

After Queen Isabella's death in 1504, the Royal Council began to grow corrupt and influenced by the nobility once more. King Philip I was an ineffective ruler who only reigned two years; after him, the government theoretically fell to Ferdinand and Isabella's daughter, Queen Joanna I of Castile, and her six-year-old son Charles of Ghent, the future Emperor Charles V. Joanna was considered incompetent, and Charles too young.  Archbishop Cisneros ruled a brief time as regent, but was undercut by noble schemes and spent much of his time simply trying to hold together the national government.

Cisneros was then replaced by Joanna's father King Ferdinand II, whose claim to rule Castile with his wife's death was rather weak, but no other plausible choice than his being regent existed.  Ferdinand was often an absent ruler of Castile, living in Aragon, and the Royal Council managed his affairs. During this period, it became even more corrupt and ineffectual. Nobles illegally expanded their domains by force, sending soldiers to "claim" land that was owned by the royal government or free peasants. The council, corrupt and bribed, usually ignored these incidents, allowing nobles to freely enrich themselves at the cost of justice and the national government.

Charles I of Habsburg: Revolt and reform
After Ferdinand's death in 1516, Cisneros served as regent again for a brief time more, and then Charles I was crowned king now that he was of age.  However, the young king was at the time almost completely controlled by Flemish advisors such as William de Croÿ, sieur de Chièvres, and he did not undertake any efforts to change the Council at first.  Additionally, Charles' new government levied high taxes and demands on Castile, with its ambitions over all Europe. Charles was the King, becoming Charles V Holy Roman Emperor in 1519, of one of the largest empires, the Spanish Empire, in European and world history - "The empire on which the sun never sets."  The Bishop of Badajoz, Ruiz de la Mota, was an influential member of the Royal Council and declared to the Cortes of Corunna that Castile was to be the empire's "treasury and sword."

When Charles left Spain in 1520, the Revolt of the Comuneros broke out against royal government.  Much of their complaints were against the Council—representatives of Valladolid's radical parishes were unanimous in a statement blaming the council's "bad government" for the kingdom's troubles.  The Royal Council would lead the royalist forces against the rebels in Charles' absence.  Charles left as regent the Dutch Cardinal Adrian of Utrecht, by most accounts a decent ruler saddled with a difficult situation.  Much of the Royal Council agitated for vigorous punishment against the rebels, such as its hated president, Antonio de Rojas.  These early reprisals would backfire, and intensified the revolt's spread.

Eventually, the rebels were defeated, but Charles (who had also matured and distanced himself from his earlier advisers) realized that the Council direly needed reform.  Charles embarked upon a vigorous program to change the nature of the council, dismissing the unpopular Antonio de Rojas and replacing him with Juan de Tavera, the Archbishop of Santiago.  He also added three new councilors, Juan Manuel, Pedro de Medina, and Martín Vázquez, and generally sought to replace nobles with gentry and educated lawyers. More importantly, Charles changed the council's functions.  The Royal Council would no longer deal with the vast majority of civil law disputes and cases, allowing them to focus on administration instead.  Judicial complaints and appeals would now be dealt with by a new and expanded judiciary, the audiencias.  With the reputation of the Council restored, the quality of its appointees rose.

During this period, the Royal Council became known as the Council of Castile, to reflect that the council's power extended only over Castile and not the whole empire.  With the growth of Spain's overseas conquests, and the prodding of Charles' grand-counselor and close friend Mercurino Guttinara, the Council of Castile expanded and split.

Between the years 1522–1524, the Council of Castile reorganized the government of the Kingdom of Navarre, dismissing its viceroy, the Duke of Nájera.  A Council of Finance (Hacienda) was created, and, on 1 August, the Council of the Indies was split from the Council of Castile.

Thirty years later, in 1555, the Council of Italy was formed, yet another offspring of the Council of Castile.  Guttinara also saw the establishment of the Consejo de la Cámara de Castilla, composed of three or four trusted members of the Council who had power to deal with unpopular or secret issues.

Post Charles I: Prominence and decline 
The Royal Council came to prominence again during the minority of Charles II of Spain from 1665 to 1675–1677 in which his mother, Mariana of Austria, acted as regent. After Philip V of Spain became the first Bourbon king in 1700, the Nueva Planta decrees approved between 1707 and 1716 abolished the autonomy of the former Crown of Aragon and centralised power in Madrid. The council also played a prominent role under Charles III and Charles IV of Spain, before being abolished in 1812 by the Cortes of Cádiz. Restored in 1814 by Ferdinand VII of Spain, it was finally dissolved in 1834 by Isabel II.

References

Bibliography

 
 

Government of Spain
History of Castile